Live! is a live album by keyboardist Lonnie Liston Smith, featuring performances recorded in Brooklyn in 1977 and released by the RCA Victor label.

Reception

In his review for AllMusic, Alex Henderson stated, "this superb LP is the only live album that Lonnie Liston Smith provided in the 1970s. It's also one of the most essential and improvisatory recordings he ever came out with. Smith and his band, the Cosmic Echoes, don't hesitate to let loose during this performance ... Though the Cosmic Echoes maintain their ethereal qualities, their playing definitely has a tougher edge on stage".

Track listing
All compositions by Lonnie Liston Smith
 "Sorceress" – 6:01
 "Prelude" – 2:58
 "Expansions" – 8:30
 "My Love" – 4:45
 "Visions of a New World (Phase One)" – 2:21
 "Visions of a New World (Phase Two)" – 6:17
 "Watercolors" – 4:51
 "Sunset" – 8:30

Personnel
Lonnie Liston Smith − piano, clavinet, ARP synthesizer, Fender Rhodes electric piano
Donald Smith − vocals, flute 
Dave Hubbard − soprano saxophone, tenor saxophone
Ronald D. Miller – guitar
 Al Anderson  – bass
 Hollywood Barker – drums
Michael Carvin – percussion

References

1977 live albums
Albums produced by Bob Thiele
RCA Records live albums
Lonnie Liston Smith live albums